The Philippines competed at the 2022 World Aquatics Championships in Budapest, Hungary from 18 June to 3 July.

Swimming

Philippines entered three swimmers.

The country initially qualified six swimmers. The three other swimmers were Jerard Jacinto, Luke Gebbie, and Chloe Isleta. Jacinto did not enter citing medical reason while Gebbie was rendered unavailable due to an injury and was replaced by Jonathan Cook. Isleta was rendered ineligible due to technicalities regarding the entry of swimmers based on the method of qualification (standard entry time or minimum FINA points).

The national federation has set an initial target for the three athletes to reach the top 16 in their respective events.

Men

Women

References

Nations at the 2022 World Aquatics Championships
Philippines at the World Aquatics Championships
2022 in Philippine sport